The 2011 Armed Forces of the Philippines corruption scandal, also known as the " scandal," was a political scandal involving the alleged misuse of military funds by high-ranking members of the Armed Forces of the Philippines (AFP). The  system referred to a practice of giving millions of pesos to chiefs of staff when they retire.

An estimated PHP1.5 billion in AFP funds were allegedly placed anomalously in an unaudited pool of discretionary resources. Under the system, AFP general Carlos Garcia was alleged to have plundered PHP303 million as head of the comptroller's office while former AFP chief of staff Angelo Reyes was alleged to have received PHP50 million as send-off money.

The scandal led to the recommendation of filing of plunder charges against six retired generals and five other officers. The Philippine Department of Justice named the following in its recommendation to the Office of the Ombudsman: AFP chiefs Roy Cimatu and Diomedio Villanueva; retired military comptrollers Garcia and Jacinto Ligot; retired major general Hilario Atendido; former brigadier general Benito de Leon; retired lieutenant colonel Ernesto Paranis; active-duty officers Cirilo Tomas Donato and Roy de Vesa; former civilian auditor of Divina Cabrera; and former accountant Generoso del Castillo.

Background 
The  system refers to the money given to a retiring chief of staff as send-off money. The money used for  system was derived from funds which were diverted to retiring chiefs of staff. The way the money was diverted was uncovered by Commission on Audit auditor Heidi Mendoza when she testified on a House of Representatives Committee on Justice.

Generals Jacinto Ligot and Carlos Garcia, who were the AFP's comptrollers when the system was in place, were detained; however, the Office of the Ombudsman went into a plea bargaining agreement with Garcia, in the government withdrew their cases against him as they contended the evidence was weak.

Rabusa testified that all of the AFP chiefs of staff were recipients of send-off money; they all denied knowingly receiving such send-off money. Angelo Reyes, one of the accused recipients, committed suicide as he was compelled by Congress to testify on the matter.

Rabusa's testimony
The House Committee on Justice and Senate Blue Ribbon Committee conducted hearings on the plea bargaining agreement of the Office of the Ombudsman and retired General Carlos Garcia who has a plunder suit in the Sandiganbayan (special court for government officials). On January 26, retired Col. George Rabusa exposed the alleged  or send-off system in the military, which gives at least PHP50 million (USD1.1 million) to retiring chiefs of staff of the Armed Forces of the Philippines (AFP). Rabusa said he gave not less than 50 million pesos to Gen. Angelo Reyes when he retired.

On January 30, Rabusa further said that former AFP chiefs of staff Diomedio Villanueva and Roy Cimatu were also given send-off money. The payoffs, done monthly, were also given to vice, deputy and secretary to the joint chiefs of staff. Rabusa had been given by his comptrollers, Jacinto Ligot then Carlos Garcia, discretion on how to utilize the provisions for command-directed activities (PCDA), and these were given as send-off money to the generals.

On the next Senate Blue Ribbon Committee hearing, Rabusa said that he delivered at least PHP160 million to Garcia, who ordered him to withdraw PHP10 million 16 times. Rabusa concluded that Garcia should have given it to Villanueva. Rabusa, who had kept copies of the Security Bank receipts, did so before the Anti-Money Laundering Act was put into force. Rabusa also included all AFP chiefs of staff, from his appointment as budget officer from 2000 until he left office as recipients of the alleged send-off money.

Rabusa also admitted that he pocketed PHP50 million when he was still a budget officer from 2000 to 2002, and that wives of the generals were also given money. Representative Gloria Macapagal Arroyo issued a statement that she did not have anything to do with the alleged corruption in the military. Five of the chiefs of staff, Narciso Abaya, Dionisio Santiago, Generoso Senga, Hermogenes Esperon, and Alexander Yano, denied receiving money, and denied that their wives used government money to spend o their overseas trips.

As a result of Rabusa's allegations, Senate President pro tempore Jinggoy Estrada (who presented Rabusa as a witness in the hearings), asked Ligot on the subsequent hearing, on his wife's alleged 42 overseas trips from 1993 to 2004; the retired general refused to answer and Estrada summoned Ligot's wife Erlinda at the next hearing. Rabusa also revealed that former Representative Prospero Pichay had been given PHP1.5 million on his three visits at Gen. Villanueva's office. Pichay subsequently filed libel raps against Rabusa.

Villanueva, whose wife had just died, and Cimatu, who was then serving as special envoy to the Middle East, appeared on the Senate to deny that they received send-off money; Cimatu testified that his  were his 40 medals and citations as a soldier. Cimatu's executive assistant, Brig. Gen. Benito de Leon, admitting receiving millions of pesos from Rabusa, but insisted that the transaction was legal. Rabusa replied that de Leon's statement was a "total lie."

Mendoza's testimony
On a hearing of the House of Representatives Committee on Justice on late January 2011, former Commission on Audit (COA) auditor Heidi Mendoza testified that she uncovered irregularities in funds by the military. Among the irregularities she found was the 200 million peso AFP Inter-Agency Fund, and the US$5 million United Nations (UN) reimbursement for Filipino peacekeepers.

The AFP fund was split into three bank accounts: 50 million and 100 million pesos on United Coconut Planters Bank (UCPB) Alfaro Street, Makati, and another 50 million pesos at UCPB Tordesillas, Makati. The accounts on the Alfaro branch were covered by deposits slips while the account on the Tordesillas branch was not recorded, despite the existence of a passbook. The UCPB Tordesillas branch manager wrote to Mendoza that there was a "cover-up" by the military in the transfer of the UN fund. While the PHP200 million originated at the AFP's trust fund at the Landbank EDSA-Greenhills branch was split into three accounts, the missing PHP50 million at the UCPB Tordesillas branch was a fresh deposit.

In the case of the missing US$5 million, the United States Department of Justice legal attaché asked her if she can be allowed to audit the UN reimbursements, as a certain US$5 million which was personally picked up by a military officer in New York was not reflected in the military's accounts. Former COA chairperson Guillermo Carague disapproved Mendoza to go to New York to investigate on the matter. Two more accounts by the military, one each at General Santos and Iloilo City, which were used as clearing accounts for the UN funds, were discovered by Mendoza. Mendoza testified that Carague's orders on not to pursue the cases disheartened her; Carague, Mendoza said, was given by orders from the executive department, probably from the Executive Secretary.

See also 
Impeachment of Merceditas Gutierrez
Armed Forces and Police Savings & Loan Association, Inc.

References

2011 in the Philippines
Political scandals in the Philippines
Presidency of Benigno Aquino III